Clive Evans may refer to:
 Clive Evans (footballer)
 Clive Evans (fashion designer)